OceanFirst Bank Center (formerly Multipurpose Activity Center) is a multi-purpose student recreational facility at Monmouth University in West Long Branch, New Jersey. It was opened on August 26, 2009.  It currently hosts the Monmouth Hawks basketball teams.  It has a seating capacity of 4,100 spectators.  It adjoins the William T. Boylan Gymnasium.  The venue cost $57 million to construct.

The facility was originally named the Multipurpose Activity Center until June 2016, when the university and OceanFirst Bank reached a $4 million agreement through 2036 that included the naming rights of the facility.

See also
 List of NCAA Division I basketball arenas

References

External links

Arena information
Multipurpose Activity Center (MAC) - Monmouth University

College basketball venues in the United States
Indoor arenas in New Jersey
Sports venues in New Jersey
Basketball venues in New Jersey
Monmouth Hawks basketball
West Long Branch, New Jersey
2009 establishments in New Jersey
Sports venues completed in 2009
Indoor track and field venues in the United States
College indoor track and field venues in the United States